Alexander Jorge "Aljo" Pingol (born September 24, 1974) is a Filipino visual artist. Pingol was born in Malabon, Manila. He was the first son of Joselito G. Pingol Jr. and Elizabeth S. Pingol. He took Bachelor of Fine Arts under the Advertising arts program in University of Santo Tomas and graduated in 1996. Pingol's career was started out in animation and advertising.  In 1998-2000, Pingol worked in Toonwoork Animation House as a 2D artist.

Artistic development and career
Pingol's works characterizes a numerous styles and movements, from surrealism to a natural sense of peaceful life. Most of his works are influenced by Marc Chagall, Salvador Dalí, Pablo Picasso, and Hieronymus Bosch. His works are done by pastel, acrylic paint and oil paint.  His works are characterized by modern figurative subjects done in a surrealistic style.

Pingol was noted within the art world. He is 2nd placer in the Nuclear Free Philippines Coalition Art Competition in 1989. In Far East Broadcasting Art Competition in 2002, he got the 1st place and nominated as the Valenzuela artist of the year in 2007. Pingol was also a 1st placer in FEBC Christmas Cars National Painting Competition.

Works
 Kalesa
 Orange Gatherers
 Golden Afternoon
 Evening Promenade
 Cotton Candy Vendor II
 Egg Vendor
 Favorite Afternoon Snack
 Sorbetero
 Taho Vendor
 Growing Old With You
 Fisherboy
 Higher Ground
 Night Harvest
 Fisherman Prize
 Daydreaming in Black & White

See also
 Folk Art
 Marc Chagall
 University of Santo Tomas
 Modernism
 Surrealism

References

External links
 New Works by Aljo Pingol at Gallery Joaquin
 Aljo Pingol: Ginintuang Biyaya
 Paete Artists Guild
 Aljo Pingol Folkism Podium

1974 births
Living people
Filipino painters
University of Santo Tomas alumni